Fire and Ashes (Persian: آتش و خاكستر; Atash va khakestar) is a 1961 Iranian film directed by Khosrow Parvizi. The film featured leading romantic couple the popular Armenian-Persian singer Vigen and actress Vida Ghahremani.

References

External links

Iranian romantic drama films
1961 films